A three-level diamond interchange is a type of highway interchange where through traffic on both main roads is grade-separated from intersections which handle transferring traffic. It is similar in design to a three-level stacked roundabout except for its use of (usually signalled) conventional intersections, and can be thought of as two diamond interchanges fused together.

Road enthusiasts sometimes use the terms volleyball interchange or split-level diamond interchange to refer to these interchanges.

Description
In a three-level diamond interchange, the two main roads are on separate levels, and on a third level, usually in the middle, there is a square of one-way roads.  The square circulates clockwise where traffic drives on the left, or anticlockwise where it drives on the right.  At each corner of the square is the terminal of an exit ramp from one main road and an entrance ramp to the other main road.

Traffic transferring from one road to the other to make an overall right turn only passes through one corner of the square, at which point a right turn is made.  Transfer traffic making an overall left turn must proceed straight through the first intersection it encounters, turn left at the next, and then proceed straight through a third intersection to enter the other main roadway.

Its two-level variant is the split diamond interchange.

Its at-grade variant is the town center intersection (TCI).

Examples

Many examples of this interchange type can also be found in Texas; however, the interchanges almost always include the frontage roads as well. If the traffic amounts increase, the interchange is usually converted into a stack interchange, also as the second level of the High Five Interchange.

References

External links
 Aerial view of a three-level diamond interchange (Interstate 380 and Iowa Highway 100 in Cedar Rapids, Iowa).  Highway 100 runs from left to right; Interstate 380 runs from top to bottom.

Road interchanges